Diego García Campos (born 18 April 2000) is a Spanish footballer who plays as a forward for CF Fuenlabrada, on loan from CD Leganés.

Club career
Born in Madrid, García represented Real Madrid, Alcobendas CF and Rayo Vallecano as a youth. He made his senior debut with the latter's reserves on 6 December 2018, coming on as a second-half substitute in a 2–0 Tercera División home win against RSD Alcalá.

García scored his first senior goal on 22 September 2019, netting the opener in a 2–1 home success over AD Torrejón CF. He did not establish himself as a regular starter during the campaign, starting in just seven matches and scoring one further goal.

On 6 October 2020, García signed for CD Leganés, being initially assigned to the B-team also in the fourth division. The following 16 May, after scoring 13 goals with the B's, he made his first team debut by replacing Sabin Merino late into a 3–0 home win against UD Logroñés in the Segunda División championship.

On 3 August 2022, García was loaned to Primera Federación side CF Fuenlabrada for the season.

References

External links
 
 
 

2000 births
Living people
Footballers from Madrid
Spanish footballers
Association football forwards
Segunda División players
Segunda Federación players
Tercera División players
Rayo Vallecano B players
CD Leganés B players
CD Leganés players
CF Fuenlabrada footballers